Berberis hsuyunensis is a species of flowering plant in the family Berberidaceae, first described in 1974. It is endemic to Sichuan Province in China.

Berberis hsuyunensis is a shrub up to 2 m tall. Leaves are evergreen, simple, elliptical. Inflorescence is a large fascicle of 30-50 flowers. Berries are spherical, black.

References

hsuyunensis
Flora of Sichuan
Plants described in 1974